Al Clark (September 15, 1902 – July 13, 1971) was a prolific American film editor whose career spanned four decades, most of which was spent at Columbia Pictures. He was nominated for 5 Academy Awards and 1 Emmy during his career. He is credited with editing over 120 films, and towards the end of his career, in the 1960s, he also edited several television series.

Career
Clark began his career in 1933 at the Poverty Row studio, Tower Productions. The first film he worked on was the crime drama, The Important Witness. In 1934 he would begin his long association with Columbia Pictures, on Lambert Hillyer's crime drama, Men of the Night. His work on the 1937 screwball comedy, The Awful Truth, starring Irene Dunne and Cary Grant, earned him the first of his five Academy Award for Best Film Editing nominations. In 1939 Clark co-edited, along with Gene Havlick, Frank Capra's classic Mr. Smith Goes to Washington, which stars Jean Arthur and James Stewart. The two editors were nominated for an Academy Award, losing to the editors for Gone With the Wind. His third nomination came in 1940 for the classic political drama, All the King's Men, shared with Robert Parrish. The winner that year was Harry W. Gerstad for Champion. In 1958, he and William A. Lyon edited the western Cowboy, starring Glenn Ford and Jack Lemmon. However, the editing award that year went to Adrienne Fazan for Gigi. Clark's fifth and final Oscar nomination came in 1961, for his work on Pepe, which he co-edited by Viola Lawrence. That year the Oscar went to Daniel Mandell for The Apartment. His long association with Columbia came to an end in 1962, with Clark's work on The Interns. After his departure from Columbia, Clark edited only two more films: the 1963 comedy Hootenanny Hoot, for MGM; and the 1969 Elvis Presley western, Charro!.

Beginning in 1952 on NBC's Cavalcade of America, Clark worked sporadically on television shows. His television credits include Dennis the Menace (1959), The Twilight Zone (1963), Gilligan's Island (1964), Perry Mason (1963–65), and I Dream of Jeannie (1965). His final work in television was from 1967 to 1968 on The High Chaparral. His work on Ben Casey garnered him an Emmy Award nomination in 1963.

Filmography

(Per AFI database)

 Big Time or Bust  (1933)  
 The Important Witness  (1933)  
 Men of the Night  (1934)  
 Square Shooter  (1935)  
 The Revenge Rider  (1935)  
 Riding Wild  (1935) (credited as Albert Clark ) 
 Justice of the Range  (1935) (credited as Albert Clark ) 
 Gallant Defender  (1935)  
 Fighting Shadows  (1935) (credited as Albert Clark ) 
 Guard That Girl  (1935)  
 The Case of the Missing Man  (1935)  
 Dangerous Intrigue  (1936)  
 Ticket to Paradise  (1936) (credited as Albert C. Clark ) 
 Blackmailer  (1936)  
 More Than a Secretary  (1936)  
 End of the Trail  (1936)  
 Legion of Terror  (1936)  
 The Awful Truth  (1937)  
 Let's Get Married  (1937)  
 The Devil Is Driving  (1937)  
 It Happened in Hollywood  (1937)  
 Holiday  (1938)  
 The Lady Objects  (1938)  
 Squadron of Honor  (1938)  
 When G-Men Step In  (1938)  
 The Main Event  (1938)  
 The Little Adventuress  (1938)  
 Good Girls Go to Paris  (1939)  
 Let Us Live  (1939)  
 Mr. Smith Goes to Washington  (1939)  
 North of Shanghai  (1939) 
 Cafe Hostess (1940) 
 Escape to Glory  (1940)  
 Prairie Schooners  (1940)  
 The Lady in Question  (1940)  
 The Man with Nine Lives  (1940)  
 The Lone Wolf Meets a Lady  (1940)  
 The Lone Wolf Strikes  (1940)  
 The Devil Commands  (1941)  
 Richest Man in Town  (1941)  
 They Dare Not Love  (1941)  
 Ladies in Retirement  (1941)  
 The Adventures of Martin Eden  (1942)  
 Blondie for Victory  (1942)  
 Daring Young Man  (1942)  
 Meet the Stewarts  (1942)  
 City Without Men  (1943)  
 It's a Great Life  (1943)  
 She Has What It Takes  (1943)  
 What a Woman!  (1943)  
 Appointment in Berlin  (1943)  
 The Impatient Years  (1944)  
 One Mysterious Night  (1944)  
 She's a Sweetheart  (1944)  
 Address Unknown  (1944)  
 Sergeant Mike  (1944)  
 Counter-Attack  (1945)  
 The Gay Senorita  (1945)  
 The Girl of the Limberlost  (1945)  
 Leave It to Blondie  (1945)  
 Gallant Journey  (1946)  
 Gunning for Vengeance  (1946)  
 The Phantom Thief  (1946)  
 Tars and Spars  (1946)  
 Blondie's Anniversary  (1947)  
 Her Husband's Affairs  (1947)  
 Johnny O'Clock  (1947)  
 The Swordsman  (1948)  
 The Fuller Brush Man  (1948)  
 I Love Trouble  (1948)  
 Blondie's Reward  (1948)  
 Slightly French  (1949)  
 The Undercover Man  (1949)  
 We Were Strangers  (1949)  
 All the King's Men  (1949)  
 Convicted  (1950)  
 Emergency Wedding  (1950)  
 The Petty Girl  (1950)  
 The Family Secret  (1951)  
 Lorna Doone  (1951)  
 Never Trust a Gambler  (1951)  
 Smuggler's Gold  (1951)  
 The Texas Rangers  (1951)  
 Boots Malone  (1952)  
 The 5000 Fingers of Dr. T  (1953)  
 The Nebraskan  (1953)  
 Conquest of Cochise  (1953)  
 Last of the Comanches  (1953)  
 Bad for Each Other  (1954)  
 Naked Alibi  (1954)  
 Sign of the Pagan  (1954)  
 Tanganyika  (1954)  
 The Wild One  (1954)  
 Bring Your Smile Along  (1955)  
 New Orleans Uncensored  (1955)  
 Chief Crazy Horse  (1955)  
 The Gun That Won the West  (1955)  
 Jubal  (1956)  
 Miami Exposé  (1956)  
 You Can't Run Away from It  (1956)  
 The Last Frontier  (1956)  
 Decision at Sundown  (1957)  
 The Night the World Exploded  (1957)  
 The Tall T  (1957)  
 3:10 to Yuma  (1957)  
 The Guns of Fort Petticoat  (1957)  
 Buchanan Rides Alone  (1958)  
 Cowboy  (1958)  
 The Lineup  (1958)  
 Apache Territory  (1958)  
 Senior Prom  (1959)  
 Hey Boy! Hey Girl!  (1959)  
 The 30 Foot Bride of Candy Rock  (1959)  
 Gunmen from Laredo  (1959)  
 All the Young Men  (1960)  
 Man on a String  (1960)  
 Pepe  (1961)  
 The Underwater City  (1962)  
 13 West Street  (1962)  
 The Interns  (1962)  
 Hootenanny Hoot  (1963)  
 Charro!  (1969)

References

External links
 

1902 births
1971 deaths
American film editors